Handsworth Road is located in Sheffield, England.

Handsworth Road is a road located in Handsworth in the city of Sheffield. The road passes under the Sheffield Parkway before meeting up with Main Road in Darnall.

A number of listed buildings are located on the road including St. Mary's Church, the Cross Daggers Inn, Jeffcock Memorial Fountain and Trough and the Old Rectory.

References

Streets in Sheffield